The 1996–97 UEFA Cup was the 26th season of the UEFA Cup, the third-tier club football competition organised by the Union of European Football Associations (UEFA). It was won by German side Schalke 04, who beat Internazionale of Italy on penalties after the two-legged final finished 1–1 on aggregate. Defending champions Bayern Munich were eliminated in the first round by Valencia.

This was the last year in which the UEFA Cup final was played in a two-legged, home-and-away format. From 1998, the final was played as a single match at a neutral venue.

Format
According to 1995 UEFA ranking, Bulgaria ceded a slot to Norway.

The access list was finally increased to 117 clubs:
 all the 47 federations obtained a UEFA place,
 all the 32 national champions excluded from the Champions League group stage entered in the UEFA Cup,
 a third winner of the UEFA Intertoto Cup was added,
 3 clubs of the UEFA Fair Play ranking were confirmed.

A second qualifying round was consequently added for the first time in the history of the European competitions.

Teams
The labels in the parentheses show how each team qualified for the place of its starting round:
 TH: Title holders
 LC: League Cup winners
 Nth: League position
 IC: Intertoto Cup
 FP: Fair play
 CLQ: Relegated from the Champions League

Preliminary round

|}

First leg

Second leg

Dinamo Tbilisi won 6–2 on aggregate.

Dinamo-93 Minsk won 4–2 on aggregate.

Croatia Zagreb won 10–2 on aggregate.

Sliema Wanderers won 4–3 on aggregate.

FC Jazz won 4–1 on aggregate.

Vardar won 3–1 on aggregate.

Anorthosis Famagusta won 6–2 on aggregate.

Vojvodina won 5–1 on aggregate.

HJK won 6–5 on aggregate.

Lantana Tallinn won 2–1 on aggregate.

1–1 on aggregate; Dinamo Minsk won on away goals.

Beitar Jerusalem won 8–2 on aggregate.

Legia Warsaw won 7–2 on aggregate.

Slavia Sofia won 5–4 on aggregate.

ÍA won 2–1 on aggregate.

Lokomotiv Sofia won 7–2 on aggregate.

Skonto won 7–1 on aggregate.

Hajduk Split won 6–1 on aggregate.

APOEL won 9–3 on aggregate.

Barry Town won 2–1 on aggregate.

Žalgiris Vilnius won 3–2 on aggregate.

Košice won 6–2 on aggregate.

Haka won 3–2 on aggregate.

Mura won 2–0 on aggregate.

Hutnik Kraków won 11–2 on aggregate.

Partizan won 4–1 on aggregate.

Slovan Bratislava won 5–3 on aggregate.

Qualifying round

|}

First leg

Second leg

Dynamo Moscow won 4–2 on aggregate.

Rapid București won 2–0 on aggregate.

Neuchâtel Xamax won 6–1 on aggregate.

Halmstad won 1–0 on aggregate.

Grazer AK won 7–1 on aggregate.

Legia Warsaw won 4–1 on aggregate.

APOEL won 3–1 on aggregate.

Helsingborg won 4–1 on aggregate.

CSKA Moscow won 6–1 on aggregate.

Odense won 9–1 on aggregate.

Aberdeen won 5–4 on aggregate.

4–4 on aggregate; Barry Town won 4–2 on penalties.

Hutnik Kraków won 3–2 on aggregate.

Trabzonspor won 5–3 on aggregate.

Național București won 1–0 on aggregate.

Aarau won 4–2 on aggregate.

3–3 on aggregate; Spartak Moscow won on away goals.

Tirol Innsbruck won 5–2 on aggregate.

Torpedo Moscow won 2–1 on aggregate.

Bodø/Glimt won 7–2 on aggregate.

Lyngby won 2–0 on aggregate.

Celtic won 1–0 on aggregate.

Chornomorets Odesa won 4–2 on aggregate.

Dinamo Tbilisi won 2–1 on aggregate.

Malmö won 4–1 on aggregate.

Beşiktaş won 3–2 on aggregate.

First round

|}

First leg

Second leg

Feyenoord won 2–1 on aggregate.

Ferencváros won 5–3 on aggregate.

Slavia Prague won 5–2 on aggregate.

Beşiktaş won 3–0 on aggregate.

Hamburg won 4–0 on aggregate.

Național București won 2–0 on aggregate.

Metz won 1–0 on aggregate.

Brøndby won 7–0 on aggregate.

Club Brugge won 3–1 on aggregate.

4–4 on aggregate; Boavista won on away goals.

Valencia won 3–1 on aggregate.

Roma won 6–1 on aggregate.

Neuchâtel Xamax won 2–1 on aggregate.

Schalke 04 won 5–2 on aggregate.

Lazio won 2–1 on aggregate.

Internazionale won 4–1 on aggregate.

Aberdeen won 6–4 on aggregate.

Sporting CP won 2–1 on aggregate.

Trabzonspor won 5–2 on aggregate.

Espanyol won 3–2 on aggregate.

1–1 on aggregate; Helsingborg won on away goals.

3–3 on aggregate; Grazer AK won on away goals.

Newcastle United won 5–2 on aggregate.

Anderlecht won 5–2 on aggregate.

Vitória Guimarães won 3–2 on aggregate.

Dinamo Tbilisi won 2–1 on aggregate.

Tenerife won 4–3 on aggregate.

Borussia Mönchengladbach won 6–4 on aggregate.

AS Monaco won 4–1 on aggregate.

Spartak Moscow won 5–3 on aggregate.

4–4 on aggregate; Legia Warsaw won on away goals.

Karlsruhe won 4–2 on aggregate.

Second round

|}

First leg

Second leg

Boavista won 5–1 on aggregate.

Newcastle United won 6–3 on aggregate.

Club Brugge won 3–1 on aggregate.

1–1 on aggregate; Anderlecht won on away goals.

Metz won 3–2 on aggregate.

Feyenoord won 3–1 on aggregate.

Brøndby won 2–0 on aggregate.

Valencia won 1–0 on aggregate.

Tenerife won 5–4 on aggregate.

1–1 on aggregate; Internazionale won 5–3 on penalties.

Helsingborg won 3–1 on aggregate.

Beşiktaş won 3–2 on aggregate.

Schalke 04 won 4–3 on aggregate.

AS Monaco won 4–3 on aggregate.

Karlsruhe won 4–2 on aggregate.

Hamburg won 5–2 on aggregate.

Third round

|}

First leg

Second leg

Brøndby won 6–3 on aggregate.

Schalke 04 won 3–2 on aggregate.

AS Monaco won 5–0 on aggregate.

Anderlecht won 1–0 on aggregate.

Valencia won 5–3 on aggregate.

Newcastle United won 3–1 on aggregate.

Internazionale won 7–1 on aggregate.

Tenerife won 4–2 on aggregate.

Quarter-finals

|}

First leg

Second leg

Tenerife won 2–1 on aggregate.

AS Monaco won 4–0 on aggregate.

Internazionale won 3–2 on aggregate.

Schalke 04 won 3–1 on aggregate.

Semi-finals

|}

First leg

Second leg

Internazionale won 3–2 on aggregate.

Schalke 04 won 2–1 on aggregate.

Final

First leg

Second leg

1–1 on aggregate; Schalke 04 won 4–1 on penalties.

Top scorers
The top scorers from the 1996–97 UEFA Cup are as follows:

See also
1996–97 UEFA Champions League
1996–97 UEFA Cup Winners' Cup
1996 UEFA Intertoto Cup

References

External links
1996–97 All matches UEFA Cup – season at UEFA website
Official Site
Results at RSSSF.com
 All scorers 1996–97 UEFA Cup according to (excluding preliminary round) according to protocols UEFA + all scorers preliminary round
1996/97 UEFA Cup – results and line-ups (archive)

 
UEFA Cup seasons
2